Casorati is a surname. Notable people with the surname include:

Felice Casorati (mathematician) (1835–1890), Italian mathematician
Felice Casorati (1883–1963), Italian painter, sculptor, and printmaker

Italian-language surnames